Baja Sessions is the sixth studio album by Chris Isaak, released in 1996, featuring largely acoustic arrangements.  The album contains a large number of covers, many of which are classic songs (such as the Hawaiian-tinged "Sweet Leilani" and "South of the Border (Down Mexico Way)") which refer to, or are styled to suggest, tropical, laid-back settings.  Though its title refers to Baja California, the album was recorded at San Francisco's Coast Recorders.

A 58-minute documentary was released featuring Isaak performing the songs as well as making amusing asides, surfing and generally mucking around.

Track listing

Personnel
Chris Isaak - vocals, guitar
Hershel Yatovitz - lead guitar
Rowland Salley - bass, vocals
Kenney Dale Johnson - drums

Sales and certifications

References

1996 albums
Chris Isaak albums
Reprise Records albums
Albums produced by Erik Jacobsen